The sailing competition at the 2018 Central American and Caribbean Games was held from 19 to 25 July at the Marina de Puerto Velero in Tubará, Colombia.

Medal summary

Men's events

Women's events

Open events

Controversy
The Hobie Cat 16 medal standing is currently being contested by Puerto Rico.  Puerto Rico would had won the gold medal had it not being for the Venezuelan team filing a compliant.  The Venezuelan team incorrectly filed the complaint for the seventh race instead of the correct sixth race.  The event judges granted Puerto Rico's reconsideration of their initial decision, but the next day they reversed their ruling.  Puerto Rico appealed the ruling to ODACABE, who in turn, after finding irregularities on the matter have requested the assistance of the International Sailing Federation. If Puerto Rico's reconsideration where to be granted, Guatemala would drop to bronze, Venezuela would remain in silver, and Puerto Rico would be awarded the gold medal for the event.

Medal table

References

External links
2018 Central American and Caribbean Games – Sailing

2018 Central American and Caribbean Games events
Central American and Caribbean Games
2018
Central American and Caribbean Games